Inverneill House is a country house in Argyll, western Scotland. Although the house is not listed, the walled gardens and mausoleum on the estate are protected as category B listed buildings.

The lands of Inverneill first came into Campbell hands in 1480 when the lands of Knapdale were granted to Colin Campbell, 1st Earl of Argyll. In 1773, it passed to a branch of Campbell of Craignish: Sir Archibald Campbell became the owner of the estate. Though neither the largest nor the grandest of his several estates, it was Archibald's favourite, but he was unable to live on the land as he was appointed Governor of Jamaica and then of Madras in India, dying a few months after his return. It was his elder brother, Sir James Campbell of Killean, Perthshire, who first made a home at Inverneill, using it as a summer 'cottage' for his family.

The house was of a good size in those days, having dining and drawing rooms, 8 bedrooms, a housekeeper's room, servants' rooms, pantry, kitchen and scullery, as well as outhouses containing wash house, laundry and dairy.

Lt Col. Duncan Campbell, 7th of Inverneill, added the three-storey wing around 1890. The house was occupied by the Campbell family until 1955 when it was sold, though the family continue to own Inverneill Island. The last two occupants were the Misses Olive and Una Campbell. Their sister had married and became Mrs. Ysobel Stewart of Fasnacloich was the founder of the Scottish Country Dance Society and became its first Secretary. A country dance named "Inverneill House" was composed in her honour.

Campbells of Inverneill from 1773 
General Sir Archibald Campbell, 1st of Inverneill (1739-1791)
Sir James Campbell, 2nd of Inverneill (1737-1805), M.P., of Killean
Lt.-General Sir James Campbell, 1st and last Bt., of Inverneill; 3rd of Inverneill (1763-1819)
Captain John Campbell, 4th of Inverneill (1766-1822)
Duncan Campbell, 5th of Inverneill (1771-1840)
James Archibald Campbell, 6th of Inverneill (1800-1878), D.L., J.P.
Lt. Colonel Duncan Campbell, 7th of Inverneill (1842-1922), O.B.E., D.L., J.P. 
Lt. Colonel Duncan Campbell, 8th of Inverneill (1880-1954), J.P.
John Lorne Campbell, 9th of Inverneill (1906-1996)
Colin Campbell, 10th of Inverneill (1912-1998)
Neill Diarmid Campbell, 11th of Inverneill (b. 1948)

See also
Carter-Campbell of Possil
Campbell of Craignish

References

External links
Royal Commission on the Ancient and Historical Monuments of Scotland
Burkes Landed Gentry, 1991 - Campbell of Inverneill

Houses in Argyll and Bute